The 2020 Louisville City FC season was the club's sixth season in Louisville, Kentucky playing in the United Soccer League Championship (USL-C), which as of 2020 is the second-tier league in the United States soccer league system.  This article covers the period from November 18, 2019, the day after the 2019 USL-C Playoff Final, to the conclusion of the 2020 USL-C Playoff Final, scheduled for November 12–16, 2020.

Current squad

Competitions

Exhibitions

USL Championship

Standings — Group E

Results summary

Match results
On December 20, 2019, the USL announced the 2020 season schedule, creating the following fixture list for the early part of Louisville City's season.

In the preparations for the resumption of league play following the shutdown prompted by the COVID-19 pandemic, Louisville City's schedule was announced on July 2.

USL Cup Playoffs

U.S. Open Cup 

As a USL Championship club, Louisville will enter the competition in the Second Round, to be played April 7–9.

Player statistics

Top scorers

Assist leaders

Clean sheets

Disciplinary

References

Louisville City FC seasons
Louisville City FC
Louisville City
Louisville City